Edward Blaine "Ned" Shillington (born August 28, 1944, in Moose Jaw, Saskatchewan, Canada) is a lawyer, consultant and former Canadian politician. He was a member of the Saskatchewan New Democratic Party and was a member of the Legislative Assembly of Saskatchewan from 1975 to 1999.  He served in the Cabinets of Premier Allan Blakeney and also Premier Roy Romanow.

Early life 

The son of Sterling Arthur Shillington and Dorathy Jennie Henry, Shillington studied law at the University of Saskatchewan, articled in Regina and set up practice in Moosomin. In 1970, he married Sonia Koroscil.

Political career

First attempt 

Shillington ran unsuccessfully as an NDP candidate in the Saskatchewan general election of 1971, in the riding of Moosimin. He was then appointed as executive assistant to the Attorney General for Saskatchewan, Roy Romanow, from 1971 to 1975.

Blakeney government (1975-1980) 

He again stood for election in the general election of 1975, this time in the riding of Regina Centre, and was elected.  He served in the provincial cabinet of Premier Allan Blakeney in a variety of positions, initially as Minister of Consumer Affairs.  In that position, he was responsible for introducing rent control legislation, during a period of rapidly increasing residential rents.  At various times, he also held the positions of Minister of Co-operation and Co-operative Development, Minister of Government Services, Minister of Culture and Youth, and Minister of Education.

Opposition (1982-1991) 

Shillington left Cabinet in 1980, but continued to sit as a member of the Legislative Assembly.  In the general election of 1982, when the NDP was defeated, he was one of the nine NDP members elected, and sat in the Opposition.

Romanow Government (1991-1998) 
When the NDP was returned to power in 1991, Shillington was also re-elected.  In the Romanow government, at various times he was the Associate Minister of Finance, the Minister of Labour, the Minister of Justice and Attorney General, the Minister of Intergovernmental Relations and the Provincial Secretary.

Later career 

Shillingon resigned his seat in 1999 to become a consultant, later moving to Calgary, Alberta.  Rendered paraplegic, he sat on the Board of Directors of the Alberta Branch of the Canadian Paraplegic Association.

References

1944 births
Living people
Saskatchewan New Democratic Party MLAs
20th-century Canadian politicians
21st-century Canadian politicians
People with paraplegia
People from Moose Jaw
Politicians from Regina, Saskatchewan
Members of the Executive Council of Saskatchewan